Robert Herman Orlando Corbin (15 February 1948) is a Guyanese politician who was the Leader of the Opposition People's National Congress (PNC) between 2003 and 2012.

Born in Linden, Guyana, Corbin worked for the Youth Ministry of the Presbyterian Church before being educated in social work and law at the University of Guyana and the Hugh Wooding Law School. He worked as a social worker from 1966 to 1977 and during this time joined the PNC youth arm, the Young Socialist Movement before taking up a seat on the party's Central Executive Committee.

Corbin, who was first elected to the National Assembly of Guyana in 1973, became one of the leading lights in the PNC, serving the party as Senior Vice Chairman and General Secretary as well as holding a number of government ministries, including the office of Deputy Prime Minister from 1985 to 1992. Elected PNC chairman in 2000, in December 2002 became acting party leader following the death of Desmond Hoyte. In February 2003 he was officially chosen to lead the PNC.

A disappointing defeat for the PNC in the 2006 legislative elections saw Corbin's leadership come under scrutiny, although ultimately his two prospective challengers withdrew before a contest could be organised and his leadership was affirmed. He was temporarily replaced as the chairman by Bishwaishwar Ramsaroop in 2010. In July 2012 Corbin was succeeded as party leader by David Arthur Granger.

Corbin, who is married with five grown-up children, continues to practice as an attorney-at-law. He is also the younger brother of singer and actor Sol Raye.

References

External links
Images of Corbin at a PNC rally

Living people
1948 births
Government ministers of Guyana
Guyanese social workers
Members of the National Assembly (Guyana)
People's National Congress (Guyana) politicians
People from Linden, Guyana